Of Black America was a series of seven one-hour documentaries presented by CBS News in the summer of 1968, at the end of the Civil Rights Movement and during a time of racial unrest (Martin Luther King had been assassinated that spring and riots in many cities had followed). The groundbreaking series explored various aspects of the history and current state of African-American community. The executive producer was Perry Wolff, and the series was sponsored by the Xerox Corporation.

The series was presented in prime time at 10:00 PM, on Tuesdays (a slot then usually reserved for CBS Reports documentaries and news shows), except for the last episode which aired on a Monday.

The first installment ("Black History: Lost, Stolen, Strayed") won an Emmy Award and a Writers Guild of America Award for Andy Rooney. Hal Walker, who co-anchored the final segment ("Portrait in Black and White") with Charles Kuralt, was the first African American correspondent for CBS News and one of the first black journalists on national television news. He had just recently joined CBS after winning a local Emmy Award and the Capital Press Club's Journalist of the Year award for his work on "A Dialogue with Whitey", a special report for WTOP about the King assassination riots in Washington, D. C. This final segment featured the results of a large and  extensive poll of both African-Americans and whites by Opinion Research Corporation.

Episodes

References

CBS News
1968 in American television
African-American television